Pavshino is a rural locality (a village) in Novlenskoye  Rural Settlement, Vologodsky District, Vologda Oblast, Russia. The population was 8 as of 2002.

Geography 
The distance to Vologda is 67 km, to Novlenskoye is 7 km.

References 

Rural localities in Vologodsky District